Robert Alexander Walker,  (March 6, 1916 – March 28, 1989) was a Canadian lawyer who served in the Legislative Assembly of Saskatchewan from 1948 to 1967.

Walker was born in Regina, Saskatchewan, the son of G.H. Walker and Jean McMillan, and was educated in Mazenod and at the University of Saskatchewan. In 1941, he married Rosa Rebecca Nagel.

First elected to the Saskatchewan assembly as the CCF member for Hanley constituency in the 1948 general election, he went on to re-election in 1952, and 1956.  In 1956 he joined the cabinet of Premier Tommy Douglas as Attorney General and Provincial Secretary.  He continued in those roles following his re-election in  1960.  After Douglas left to lead the federal NDP in 1961, Woodrow Lloyd became premier and the first universal medical care plan in Canada was introduced after the doctor's strike.  In the 1964 general election, Walker was narrowly defeated according to the count on election day, but the election was voided  He was re-elected in the subsequent by-election in December 1964 and served in the CCF-NDP opposition until he was defeated in the 1967 general election.

After he left the cabinet in 1964, he resumed the practice of law in Saskatoon until 1984 when he retired to Victoria, British Columbia where he died in 1989.  He was survived by his wife, Rosa Rebecca Nagel (who died in Victoria in 2005), 4 children and many grandchildren, including future British Columbia MLA, Adam Walker.

References

External links
Walker, Robert "Bob" at Saskatchewan Politicians: Lives Past and Present (University of Regina / Canadian Plains Research Center. University of Regina Press, 2004) 

1916 births
1989 deaths
Lawyers in Saskatchewan
Canadian King's Counsel
Canadian socialists
Saskatchewan Co-operative Commonwealth Federation MLAs
20th-century Canadian politicians
University of Saskatchewan alumni
Attorneys-General of Saskatchewan
Saskatchewan New Democratic Party MLAs
Politicians from Regina, Saskatchewan
University of Saskatchewan College of Law alumni